Kiran Haq is a Pakistani television actress. Haq had a supporting role in 2011 series Akbari Asghari. She has appeared as lead in several television serials including Shehr-e-Ajnabi, Maan, Tum Mere Kya Ho, Sangdil, Khaali Haath and Naulakha.

Career
Haq started out as a fashion model. In 2010, Haq became a television actress, appearing in a number of dramas and serials. She debuted in Tere Pehlu Mein as Kiran. In 2014, Haq was cast in the lead role of Ufaq in the drama series Shehr-e-Ajnabi, which first aired in Pakistan on the A-Plus Entertainment channel.

Filmography

Film

Television

References

External links
 

Living people
Actresses from Lahore
Pakistani television actresses
Punjabi people
Year of birth missing (living people)